The Women's individual pursuit tandem B1-3 track cycling event at the 2004 Summer Paralympics was competed on 21 & 22 September. It was won by Karissa Whitsell and her sighted pilot Katie Compton, representing .

Qualifying

21 Sept. 2004, 10:10

1st round

22 Sept. 2004, 10:10

Heat 1

Heat 2

Heat 3

Heat 4

Final round

22 Sept. 2004, 12:15
Gold

Bronze

References

W
Para